The 1930 All-Ireland Senior Hurling Championship Final was the 43rd All-Ireland Final and the culmination of the 1930 All-Ireland Senior Hurling Championship, an inter-county hurling tournament for the top teams in Ireland. The match was held at Croke Park, Dublin, on 7 September 1930 between Tipperary and Dublin. The Leinster champions lost to their Munster opponents on a score line of 2-7 to 1-3.

Match details

Miscellaneous
 This was the first hurling final to be refereed by a Connacht man.

1
All-Ireland Senior Hurling Championship Finals
Dublin GAA matches
Tipperary GAA matches
All-Ireland Senior Hurling Championship Final
All-Ireland Senior Hurling Championship Final, 1930